Calymenina is a suborder of the trilobite order Phacopida.

References

 
Phacopida
Prehistoric animal suborders
Arthropod suborders
Devonian trilobites
Trilobites of Australia